"Halcyon" is the fourth single by British alternative dance band Delphic, and is the sixth track on their debut album Acolyte. The single reached #143 in the UK singles chart.

Advertising
The song was featured nationwide on the new 2010 advert for the Samsung Monte mobile phone.

Music video
The video features the band dressed in hooded black robes, standing on top of a mound of slates. A woman dances in the wind, whilst the drummer plays on branches and stones. Shots of wool also feature heavily throughout the video.

Track listing
7"
 "Halcyon"
 "Wake"

Download
 "Halcyon"
 "Wake"
 "Halcyon (L-Vis 1990 remix)"
 "Halcyon (Silkie remix) [iTunes exclusive]"

Chart performance

References

2010 singles
Delphic songs
2010 songs
Polydor Records singles
Songs written by Richard Boardman